Astarte was an all-female black metal band from Athens, Greece, named after the goddess Astarte.

History
Astarte first formed under the name Lloth in September 1995 at Athens, Attica. The original line-up included Maria "Tristessa" Kolokouri (bass, guitar, keyboards), who subsequently took over on lead vocals, Nemesis (guitar), and Kinthia (vocals, guitar). They had Psychoslaughter, the drummer from Greek band Invocation, play for the sessions on their demo, Dancing in the Dark Lakes of Evil, released as Lloth in 1997. Shortly thereafter they adopted the name Astarte, named after the Semitic goddess of sexuality. Their debut full-length album, Doomed Dark Years, appeared in 1998 on Black Lotus Records; two further LPs followed on the label. After lineup changes in which Nemesis and Kinthia left to be replaced by Katharsis (keyboards) and Hybris (guitar), they released their fourth and fifth albums on Avantgarde Music, the most recent of which, Demonized, was released in 2007. In 2003 the band participated in the Celtic Frost Tribute album Order of the Tyrants, released by Black Lotus Records, covering the song "Sorrows Of The Moon".

On December 30, 2013, Maria Kolokouri's husband Nick Maiis released a statement revealing that she had leukemia and was critically ill. On August 9, 2014, Maiis posted another statement on behalf of his wife, saying that, while Maria had beaten the leukemia, the complications from the disease had caused her to take a turn for the worse and she was not expected to survive the day. Shortly afterwards another post was made to Tristessa's official Facebook page saying that she had just died.

On August 10, 2014, Metal Archives reported that, following Tristessa's death Astarte had split-up, as she was the leader and only consistent member during Astarte's nearly-twenty year career.

In September 2014 the remaining members of Astarte announced that they would be reuniting and adopting their initial name, Lloth. They said that they would be joined with some previous members from the band's early incarnation to release a new album (their first since their 1997 demo Dancing in the Dark Lakes of Evil) dedicated to Tristessa's memory and legacy. The group also revealed their new logo, which draws attention to the "t" in Lloth, which is also in Tristessa's honour.

Members

Final lineup
Derketa – keyboards
Nikos "Ice" Asimakis – drums
Lycon – session guitars, bass
Hybris – guitar (2003–2014)

Former members
Nemesis – guitar (1995–2003)
Kinthia – guitar, lead vocals (1995–2003)
Katharsis – keyboards (2003–2008)
Psychoslaughter aka Aithir – session drums (1995–1997)
Stelios Darakis – drums
Stelios Mavromitis – guitars
SIC – vocals
Maria "Tristessa" Kolokouri – bass, guitar, keyboards (1995–2014), vocals (2003–2014; died in August 2014)

Special guests
 Spiros Antoniou from Septicflesh ("Astarte" of the album Quod superius sicut inferius)
 SIC from Lloth ("Bitterness of Mortality (Mecoman)" of the album Sirens)
 Shagrath from Dimmu Borgir ("The Ring (of Sorrow)" of the album Sirens)
 Sakis Tolis from Rotting Christ ("Oceanus Procellarum (Liquid Tomb)" of the album Sirens)
 Attila Csihar from Mayhem ("Lycon" of the album Demonized)
 SIC from Lloth ("God Among Men" of the album Demonized)
 Henri Sattler from God Dethroned ("Queen of the Damned" of the album Demonized)
 Angela Gossow from Arch Enemy ("Black at Heart" of the album Demonized)

Discography
Lloth
Dancing in the Dark Lakes of Evil (1997)

Astarte
Doomed Dark Years (1998), Black Lotus Records
Rise From Within (2000), Black Lotus
Quod superius sicut inferius (2002), Black Lotus
Sirens (2004), Avantgarde Music
Demonized (2007), Avantgarde Music

References

External links
Encyclopaedia Metallum Profile
Official MySpace

All-female bands
Greek black metal musical groups
Musical groups established in 1995
Musical groups disestablished in 2014
Musical quintets
Blackened death metal musical groups
Musical groups from Athens
1995 establishments in Greece